District 150 is a district in the Texas House of Representatives that encompasses part of Harris County. The district's first term started on January 11, 1983. The current representative of this District is Valoree Swanson who started serving on January 10, 2017.

Representatives

References

150
Harris County, Texas